The 2000–01 Scottish Second Division was won by Partick Thistle who, along with second placed Arbroath, were promoted to the First Division. Queen's Park and Stirling Albion were relegated to the Third Division.

Table

Attendance
The average attendance for Scottish Second Division clubs for season 2000/01 are shown below:

Scottish Second Division seasons
2
3
Scot